Izrail Moiseyevich Leplevsky (Russian: Израиль Моисеевич Леплевский; 1894 – July 28, 1938) was a Soviet security officer. He was part of the Intelligence Service and Secret police apparatus in the Ukrainian Soviet Socialist Republic, then People's Commissar of Internal Affairs of the Ukrainian SSR from June 14, 1937 to January 25, 1938. His brother Gregory Leplevsky also worked in senior positions in the Soviet Union, including as Prosecutor of the USSR.

Early years
Born into a Jewish family in Brest-Litovsk, Grodno Governorate, Leplevsky received a home education and worked afterwards in a hat shop, and in a pharmacy warehouse. In 1914 he was enrolled as a conscript in the Russian army and served on the Turkish front from October 1914 till June 1917.

Political career
In March 1917, Leplevsky became active in the Bolshevik party in Tbilisi. From June 1917 he was a member of the military organization of the RSDLP (Bolshevik) in Yekaterinoslav. Afterwards, he made a career in the Soviet secret service, the GPU, in the Ukrainian Soviet Socialist Republic, culminating in his appointment as People's Commissar of Internal Affairs of the Ukrainian SSR from June 14, 1937 to January 25, 1938. During this period he was in charge of mass repressions in Ukraine. He established the plan for the elimination of the enemies of the people and was responsible for the death of more than 63.950 people.

He was arrested on April 26, 1938, and on 28 July he was shot according to a sentence passed by the Military Collegium of the Supreme Court of the USSR.

References 

1894 births
1938 deaths
Cheka officers
NKVD officers
People from Skrunda Municipality
Communist Party of the Soviet Union members
Commissars 2nd Class of State Security
People's Commissars for Internal Affairs of the Byelorussian Soviet Socialist Republic
Recipients of the Order of Lenin
Recipients of the Order of the Red Banner
Great Purge victims from Belarus
Members of the Communist Party of the Soviet Union executed by the Soviet Union
Soviet Jews